is a mountain located in the Hidaka Mountains, Hokkaidō, Japan. The western summit of Mount Memuro (1746 m) is named Mount Pankenūshi.

References
 Shyun Umezawa, Yasuhiko Sugawara, and Jun Nakagawa, Hokkaidō Natsuyama Gaido 4: Hidaka Sanmyaku no Yamayama (北海道夏山ガイド4日高山脈の山やま), Sapporo, Hokkaidō Shimbunshya, 1991. 
 Geographical Survey Institute
 Google Maps

Memuro